The 1977 Hall of Fame Classic was a college football postseason bowl game between the Minnesota Golden Gophers and the Maryland Terrapins.

Background
The Golden Gophers finished fifth in the Big Ten Conference while the Terrapins finished tied for third in the Atlantic Coast Conference. This was Maryland's second bowl game in the calendar year of 1977. This was Minnesota's first bowl game since 1962.

Game summary
George Scott rushed 24 times for 75 yards, with two touchdowns in the second quarter that proved to be the winning points.

First quarter
Minnesota – Barber 1-yard run (Rogind kick) 9:02 left
Maryland  – Sochko 32-yard field goal 5:21 left

Second quarter
Maryland  – Scott 2-yard run (Sochko kick) 7:04 left 
Maryland  – Scott 1-yard run (Sochko kick) 4:53 left

Aftermath
Minnesota did not reach a bowl game again until 1985. Maryland reached two more bowl games before Jerry Claiborne left for Kentucky after the 1981 season.

Statistics

References

Hall of Fame Classic
All-American Bowl
Maryland Terrapins football bowl games
Minnesota Golden Gophers football bowl games
December 1977 sports events in the United States
1977 in sports in Alabama